The Huiva ((Guyva) is a river of northern Ukraine, flowing through the territory of Khmilnyk Raion of Vinnytsia Oblast and Andrushivka Raion and Zhytomyr Raion of Zhytomyr Oblast. It is a right tributary of the Teteriv.

The river has a length of 97 km and basin area of 1505 km ². The Huiva flows through the cities of Koziatyn and Andrushivka.

The biggest tributaries are: Pustoha, Kodenka.

References

Rivers of Vinnytsia Oblast
Rivers of Zhytomyr Oblast
Andrushivka